The Esaro is a river in the province of Cosenza, Calabria, southern Italy. Its source is near Sant'Agata di Esaro. The river flows northeast near Roggiano Gravina before being joined by a left tributary, the Grondo, and a right tributary a short distance further. It then joins the Coscile as a right tributary of that river north of Spezzano Albanese, near the ancient site known as Interamnium. It is the main tributary of the Coscile.

References

Rivers of the Province of Cosenza
Rivers of Italy